Focal or FOCAL may refer to:

Focal (lexicographical website), an Irish lexicographical website
FOCAL (programming language), a programming language for the PDP-8 and similar machines
Focal (HP-41), for programming HP calculators
FOCAL (spacecraft), a proposed space telescope
FOCAL International, a trade body representing the film archive industry
Focal-JMLab, a French manufacturer of audio equipment
Focal Radio, a radio station based in Stoke-on-Trent, England
Focal neurologic signs

See also
Focal point (disambiguation)
Focus (disambiguation)